Utetheisa salomonis is a disputed moth species of the family Erebidae. It is found on the Loyalty Islands, the New Hebrides, the Solomon Islands, New Britain, Fiji and New Caledonia.

Utetheisa pectinata ruberrima is now considered a synonym of U. salomonis. However, U. salomonis may itself belong into Utetheisa pulchelloides.

References

salomonis
Moths described in 1910